Trevor John Immelman (born 16 December 1979) is a South African retired professional golfer and television commentator who has played on the PGA Tour, European Tour and Sunshine Tour. He won his sole major championship at the 2008 Masters Tournament.

Early years
Immelman was born in Cape Town, South Africa. Born into a golfing family. His father, Johan, is the former commissioner of the Sunshine Tour in South Africa, while his older brother Mark is a broadcaster, teaching pro, and collegiate golf coach. He also has an older sister by the name of Michelle Greeff. Trevor took up golf at the age of five. He attended Hottentots Holland High School. He won the U.S. Amateur Public Links in 1998.

Professional golf career
Immelman turned professional in 1999. In 2000 he played mainly on the second tier professional tour in Europe, the Challenge Tour, and finished tenth on the Order of Merit. He became a full member of the European Tour in 2001 and has made the top twenty of the Order of Merit three times. He has four wins on the European Tour, and in 2004 became the first man to successfully defend the South African Open title since Gary Player in the 1970s.

In 2003 Immelman won the WGC-World Cup for South Africa in partnership with Rory Sabbatini. In 2005 he was a member of the losing International Team at the Presidents Cup. He has been playing with increasing frequency on the PGA Tour after receiving a 2-year PGA Tour exemption for 2006 and 2007 on account of this Presidents Cup appearance. In 2006 Immelman won his first PGA Tour event at the Cialis Western Open, a result that moved him into the top 15 in the Official World Golf Rankings. He won the Sunshine Tour Order of Merit in 2002/03.

Immelman withdrew from the 2006 Open Championship to be present for the birth of his first child. He finished 2006 in the top 10 of the PGA Tour money list and was named Rookie of the Year. In September 2007, Trevor Immelman was picked by Gary Player to participate in the 7th Presidents Cup held at the Royal Montreal Golf Club, Canada. The International team lost 14.5 to the US team's 19.5.

On 13 December 2007, Immelman withdrew from the South African Airways Open due to severe discomfort around his ribcage area and a problem breathing. He went into surgery the following Tuesday, 18 December 2007, and doctors discovered a lesion approximately the size of a golf ball on his diaphragm. (Immelman remarked in an interview on the obvious irony of the size of the lesion). It was diagnosed as a calcified fibrosis tumor. After more tests they discovered that it was benign.  Nevertheless, treatment and recovery caused him to miss the first eight weeks of the 2008 PGA Tour season.  However, Immelman came back to win the 2008 Masters Tournament. Despite scoring a double bogey on the 70th hole, the par 3 16th, Immelman finished with a score of 8 under par, beating favourite Tiger Woods by three strokes.

In June 2009, Immelman announced he would withdraw from the U.S. Open due to tendonitis in his left wrist and elbow, which plagued him for much of the 2009 and 2010 seasons.  As the 2013 PGA Tour neared its conclusion, Immelman's winless streak extended to five years; he was forced to play in the Web.com Tour Finals after he failed to make the FedEx Cup playoffs and his five-year exemption for winning the Masters expired. Immelman won the Hotel Fitness Championship, the first of four Web.com Tour Finals tournaments, and finished the Finals in sixth place to regain his PGA Tour card for 2014.

2018 saw a resurgence in Immelman's career. Focusing on the European Tour, he made the cut in 8 out of 13 events, with a best finish of T3 at the Aberdeen Standard Investments Scottish Open. In the event he had a chance to qualify for The Open Championship via the Open Qualifying Series, but missed an eight-foot birdie putt on the last and lost out to Jens Dantorp by world rankings. However, with the finish, Immelman moved from 1,380th in the world to 420th, his highest ranking since 2014. Immelman finished 77th on the Race to Dubai standings, regaining full status for the 2019 season.

In September 2022, Immelman captained the International team in the 2022 Presidents Cup at Quail Hollow Club in Charlotte, North Carolina. The U.S. team won 17.5–12.5.

Broadcasting

In 2017, 2018 and 2019, Turner Sports utilized Immelman as an analyst for coverage of the PGA Championship on TNT.

In December 2019, Immelman joined the PGA Tour on CBS commentating team. After Nick Faldo retired from CBS in 2022, Immelman was named the new lead golf analyst for 2023.

Personal life
Immelman married his childhood sweetheart, Carminita, on 6 December 2003. He has frequently participated in his mentor Gary Player's charity golf events around the world to help raise funds for children's causes. Immelman has a residence in Winter Park, Florida that he purchased in 2016 from former professional football player Jeff Faine.

Amateur wins
1997 South African Amateur
1998 U.S. Amateur Public Links

Professional wins (11)

PGA Tour wins (2)

PGA Tour playoff record (0–2)

European Tour wins (4)

1Co-sanctioned by the Sunshine Tour

European Tour playoff record (1–2)

Sunshine Tour wins (5)

1Co-sanctioned by the European Tour

Sunshine Tour playoff record (1–1)

Web.com Tour wins (1)

Challenge Tour wins (1)

Other wins (1)

Major championships

Wins (1)

Results timeline

CUT = missed the half-way cut
"T" = tied

Summary

Most consecutive cuts made – 6 (2004 U.S. Open – 2005 PGA)
Longest streak of top-10s – 2 (2007 PGA – 2008 Masters)

Results in The Players Championship

CUT = missed the half-way cut
WD = Withdrew
"T" indicates a tie for a place

Results in World Golf Championships

"T" indicates a tie for a place.
QF, R16, R32, R64 = Round in which player lost in match play
Note that the HSBC Champions did not become a WGC event until 2009.

Team appearances
Amateur
Eisenhower Trophy (representing South Africa): 1998

Professional
World Cup (representing South Africa): 2003 (winners), 2004, 2005, 2007
Presidents Cup (International Team): 2005, 2007, 2022 (non-playing captain)

See also
2013 Web.com Tour Finals graduates

References

External links

South African male golfers
Sunshine Tour golfers
European Tour golfers
PGA Tour golfers
Winners of men's major golf championships
Golf writers and broadcasters
Korn Ferry Tour graduates
Sportspeople from Cape Town
White South African people
1979 births
Living people